This is a list of vehicles designed or produced by AZLK, a defunct Russian carmaker best known under its Moskvitch brand.

Vehicles by generation

First (1940–1956)

 KIM 10–50 (1940–1941) 2-door compact car
 KIM 10–51 (1941) the same car with a Phaeton body
 KIM-10-52 (1945) 4-door compact car
 Moskvitch 400-420 Flathead engine, 23 hp (1946–1954) – copy of 1939 Opel Kadett K38
 Moskvitch 400-420A (4-door convertible, priced below closed models but low sales) (1949–52)
 Moskvitch 400-420B (version of 400 for disabled persons)
 Moskvitch 400-420K (cab-chassis version of 400)
 Moskvitch 400-420M (medical sedan version of 400)
 Moskvitch 400–421 (prototype five-door version of 400–422) (1946)
 Moskvitch 400–422 (three-door "woodie" station wagon version of 400) (1949)
 Moskvitch 400–424 (prototype for 401)
 Moskvitch 400E-431-442 (airplane engine starter version of 400) (1951–1953)
 Moskvitch 400P-431-441 (prototype truck based on 400) (1951)
 Moskvitch 401–420 Flathead engine, 26 hp (1954–1956)
 Moskvitch 401-420B (invalid car version of 401)
 Moskvitch 401-420K (cab-chassis version of 401)
 Moskvitch 401-420M (medical sedan version of 401)
 Moskvitch 401–422 ("woodie" station wagon version of 401) (1954)
 Moskvitch 401–423 (prototype redesigned version of 401) (1949–1951)
 Moskvitch 401A1-420 (401 powered by 402 engine) (1956)

Second (1956–1965)

 Moskvitch 402 (with modified Opel flathead engine 35 hp) (1956–1958)
 Moskvitch 423 (station wagon version of 402) (1957–1958)
 Moskvitch 429 (two-door delivery van prototype, based on 402)
 Moskvitch 430 (two-door delivery van version of 423) (1958)
 Moskvitch 410 (four-wheel drive version of 402) (1957–1958)
 Moskvitch 410N (four wheel drive version of 407) (1958–1961)
 Moskvitch 411 (station wagon version of 410) (1958–1961)
 Moskvitch 431 (delivery van prototype, based on 410N)
 Moskvitch 407 (45 hp OHV engine) (1958–1964)
 Moskvitch 423N (station wagon version of 407) (1958–1963)
 Moskvitch 403 (45 hp OHV engine) (1962–1965)
 Moskvitch 424 (station wagon version of 403) (1963–1965)
 Moskvitch 432 (delivery van version of 403) (1964)

Third (1965–1986)

 Moskvitch 408  OHV , modified 1360 cc 407-engine (1964–1975)
 Moskvitch 433 (panel van version of 408) (1966–1975)
 Moskvitch 426 (station wagon version of 408) (1967–1975)
 Moskvitch 412 (1967–1975) (latterly known as a Moskvitch 1500 for the Western export market)
 Moskvitch 427 (station wagon version of 412) (1967–1975)
 Moskvitch 434 (panel van version of 412) (1967–1975)
 Moskvitch-2140 (1976–1988) (carried on the scheme of using the Moskvitch 1500 name for Western exports)
 Moskvitch 2136 (similar to 2137, but with 408 engine) (1976)
 Moskvitch 2137 (station wagon version of 2140) (1976–1988)
 Moskvitch 2734 (panel van version of 2140) (1976–1981)
 Moskvitch 2138 (similar to 2140, but with 408 engine) (1976–1982)
 Moskvitch 2140SL (1981–1986, also known as 1500SL) (improved 2140, Super Lux was made for foreign markets)
 Moskvitch 2733 (panel van version of 2136)
 Moskvitch Bolivar (tow truck prototype, based on 2140)

Fourth (1986–2003)

 Moskvitch 2141 Aleko (1986–1997)
 Moskvitch 2335 (1993, pickup truck based on 2141)
 Moskvitch 2336 (cab-chassis truck based on 2141)
 Moskvitch 2340 (all wheel drive version of 2335)
 Moskvitch 2344 (2000, front-drive version of 2335)
 Moskvitch 2901 (1994, van version of 2141)
 Moskvitch 2141 Moskvitch Sviatogor (1997) (a name taken from Russian mythology)
 Moskvitch 2142 (1997–2003)
 Moskvitch 2142 Dolgorukiy (1997) (named after Yuri Dolgorukiy, founder of Moscow)
 Moskvitch 2142 Kalita (1998) (named after Ivan Kalita, a 14th-century Russian prince)
 Moskvitch 2142 Kniaz Vladimir (1998) (named after Prince Vladimir)
 Moskvitch 2142 Duet (1999)

Fifth (2022–present) 
 Moskvitch 3 (2022–present)
 Moskvitch 3e (electric version)
 Moskvitch Model II
 Moskvitch Model III
 Moskvitch Model IV
 Moskvitch Model V

Sport and racing cars
 Moskvitch 404 Sport (1950s)
 Moskvitch 409 (1962)
 Moskvitch 412R (1972)
 Moskvitch 2141KR (1988)
 Moskvitch G1 (1955)
 Moskvitch G2 (1956)
 Moskvitch G3 (1961)
 Moskvitch G4 (1963)
 Moskvitch G5 (1965)

Prototypes

 Moskvitch 444 (1956–1958, later built as the ZAZ-965)
 Moskvitch A9 (1957, development moved to RAF)
 Moskvitch 4x4 (1958)
 Moskvitch 415 (1959)
 Moskvitch 415S (1966, improved 415)
 Moskvitch 416 (1958–1959, hardtop version of 415)
 Moskvitch 408 Tourist (1964, prototype 4-seat convertible based on 408)
 Moskvitch PT (1964–1965, prototype minibus taxi)
 Moskvitch 2148 (1973)
 Moskvitch 2150 (1973)
 3·5 Series
 Moskvitch 3·5·2 (1970, based on the M-408)
 Moskvitch 3·5·3 (station wagon version of 3·5·2)
 Moskvitch 3·5·4 (modernized 3·5·2)
 Moskvitch 3·5·5 (1972, based on the 3·5·2)
 Moskvitch 3·5·6 (1975)
 C Series
 Moskvitch Delta
 Moskvitch S1 (1975)
 Moskvitch S2 (developed from the S1)
 Moskvitch S3 (1976)
 Moskvitch S4
 Moskvitch 434G (1978–1979, prototype pickup truck based on 412)
 Moskvitch 2144 Istra (1985)
 Moskvitch 8135 (1989, prototype trailer)
 Moskvitch 2143 Yauza (1991)
 Moskvitch X1

Gallery

Moskvitch
Moskvitch